Ronald Lloyd "Ron" Zinn (May 10, 1939 – July 7, 1965) was a race walker from the United States, who represented his native country at two Summer Olympics, starting in 1960. His best finish was sixth place in the men's 20 km walk at the 1964 Summer Olympics in Tokyo, Japan. He came in third in the 20 km event at the 1963 Pan American Games.

Ron Zinn was born in Peoria, Illinois. He graduated from the United States Military Academy at West Point in 1962 and served in the United States Army during the Vietnam War. Zinn was killed in a firefight in War Zone D while serving as platoon leader B Company, 2nd Battalion, 503rd Infantry Regiment, 173rd Airborne Brigade. He held the rank of Lieutenant at the time of his death.

Camp Zinn, an Army base east of Bien Hoa Air Base, was named in his honor. Additionally, USA Track and Field annually recognizes the top male and female race walker in the country with an award bearing his name.

References

Sources
 Ronald Zinn, CPT, Army, Orland Park IL, 07Jul65 02E030 - The Virtual Wall
 
 

1939 births
1965 deaths
American military personnel killed in the Vietnam War
American male racewalkers
Athletes (track and field) at the 1960 Summer Olympics
Athletes (track and field) at the 1963 Pan American Games
Athletes (track and field) at the 1964 Summer Olympics
Burials at West Point Cemetery
Olympic track and field athletes of the United States
Sportspeople from Illinois
Pan American Games bronze medalists for the United States
Pan American Games medalists in athletics (track and field)
Medalists at the 1963 Pan American Games
United States Army personnel of the Vietnam War
United States Army officers
Olympians killed in warfare